The Louisiana Brigade Winter Camp, also known as Camp Carondelet, was the site of an American Civil War military camp during the winter of 1861–62. The site was used by five battalions of Louisiana soldiers of the Confederate Army, whose distinctive buttons (bearing a pelican emblem) have long been found by relic hunters. Obvious remnants of the camp include the remains of 25 huts, some of which have been damaged or destroyed by road-building activity through the site, and chimneys representing the locations of an estimated 50 more.

The camp location was listed on the National Register of Historic Places in 1989.

References

Military facilities on the National Register of Historic Places in Virginia
Military installations established in 1861
Prince William County, Virginia
1861 establishments in Virginia
Archaeological sites on the National Register of Historic Places in Virginia
National Register of Historic Places in Prince William County, Virginia
American Civil War on the National Register of Historic Places